Charra is a locality in the Australian state of South Australia located on the state’s west coast overlooking the Great Australian Bight about  north-west of the state capital of Adelaide and about  west of the municipal seat of Ceduna.

Charra consists of land in the cadastral units of the hundreds of Horn in the west and Bartlett in the east.

The name Charra was first used in 1864 in the name of a pastoral lease known as the “Charra Run” which was held by Messrs. R.B. Smith and W.R. Swan. The name was later given to a railway station on the Penong branch of the Eyre Peninsula Railway which is located within the present locality. The name was given to the locality were created in January 1999 and whose boundaries include the ceased government town. Three schools are connected historically to the name with the first operating from 1897 to 1902, the second, the Charra Plains School, operating from 1933 to 1940 and the third, the Charra Woolshed School, which operated from 1904 to 1931 when it was renamed as "Uworra" until its closure in 1944.

As of 2012, the majority land use within the locality was agriculture while the land adjoining the coastline in the south being zoned for conservation.

Charra is located within the federal Division of Grey, the state electoral district of Flinders and the local government area of the District Council of Ceduna.

References

Notes

Citations

Towns in South Australia
Ghost towns in South Australia